Chichaoua is a town in Shishawa Province, Marrakesh-Safi, Morocco. According to the 2004 census it has a population of 15,657.

References

Populated places in Chichaoua Province
Municipalities of Morocco
Chichaoua